The Marriage of Figaro is a 1960 Australian TV film. It was a filmed version of Mozart's 1786 opera, sung in English.

Cast
Valda Bagnall as Susanna
Geoffrey Chard as Figaro
Heather McMillan		
Russell Smith
Marie Tysoe as Cherubino

Production
Marie Tyso had appeared in several other operas for the ABC. She was used to doing them live but this one involved pre-recorded music. "It was a much better way to do it," she said. "Of course, we now had to mime during the performance. We did the dialogue live. Alan Burke was the producer – he was wonderful to work with."

It was the sixth opera broadcast live from the ABC in Sydney and the first two-hour one done live in Australia. Settings for the four acts were devised in one unit to enable aimed at keeping the action moving continuously.

Reception
The critic for The Sydney Morning Herald praised the singing and set, saying it was "a distinguished live telecast ... producer Alan Burke boldly moved his cast about through ... [the] elaborate and fanciful set with great zest and speed."

See also
List of television plays broadcast on Australian Broadcasting Corporation (1960s)

References

External links

, from The Bobby Limb Show

Australian television plays
1960 television plays
Australian television plays based on operas
Australian Broadcasting Corporation original programming
English-language television shows
Australian live television shows
Black-and-white Australian television shows
Films based on The Marriage of Figaro
Opera films
Films directed by Alan Burke (director)